Statehood Day or the Day of Ukrainian Statehood is a national holiday in Ukraine, celebrated annually on 28 July in commemoration of Christianization of Kievan Rus'.

History 
The Day of Ukrainian statehood was established by the decree of President Volodymyr Zelenskyy in 2021 during the celebration of the 30th anniversary of Ukrainian independence and was adopted by the Verkhovna Rada (Ukrainian parliament) on 31 May 2022. It was celebrated for the first time on 28 July 2022. 

The day of 28 July was celebrated in Ukraine before the introduction of national holiday to commemorate the day of Baptism of Kyiv, which occurred under the rule of Volodymyr the Great in 988.

References

External link 

Public holidays in Ukraine
Observances in Ukraine
July observances
Summer events in Ukraine